The 1455 papal conclave (April 4–8) elected Cardinal Alfons Borja Pope Callixtus III following the death of Pope Nicholas V. The conclave was the first in the Apostolic Palace, the site of all but five papal conclaves thereafter. The conclave was also the first to feature accessus voting (votes cast in accessit), derived from a practice of the Roman Senate, where a cardinal could change their vote after an unsuccessful scrutiny to any cardinal already receiving votes.

The early defeat of Greek Cardinal Basilios Bessarion—a potential compromise candidate between the Colonna and Orsini factions—is a notable display of the lingering antipathy towards certain characteristics of the Eastern church, such as bearded priests, centuries after the East-West Schism. Although Western canon law had prohibited beards for priests since at least the eleventh century, the issue would continue to be debated well into the sixteenth century.

The election 

The two main factions of the cardinals were divided between the followers of Prospero Colonna and Latino Orsini; among the papabile were Barbo, Trevisan, Capranica, Orsini, and Bessarion. Capranica received a plurality on the first three scrutinies, with the other votes scattered; Orsini and the French cardinals rallied against Capranica because he was close to Colonna.

On April 6, Easter Sunday, the factions began to consider neutral candidates. In this capacity, Basilios Bessarion (noted for defecting from the Eastern Church following the East–West Schism) was able to receive eight votes, before his candidacy was scuttled following a speech by Alain de Coëtivy—recorded by eyewitnesses—which emphasized Bessarion's former membership in the Eastern Orthodox Church and his retention of Greek mannerisms, such as a full beard. The French cardinal is reported to have remarked:

Bessarion made no attempt to defend himself, claiming he was not interested in being elected; his reputations for reform and austerity also would have been unpopular with many of the Renaissance cardinals. Nevertheless, the renowned humanist scholar remained a strong candidate in the following 1464 conclave as well.

It is known that the early scrutinies the following Monday were disorganized; for example, non-cardinal Antonio de Montefalcone received at least one vote. de Coëtivy and Trevisan pushed for Borja's election, gaining momentum until Borja prevailed the following Tuesday. The core of the requisite two-thirds majority was likely composed of the French, Spanish, and Venetian cardinals: Trevisan, de Coëtivy, Barbo, Orsini, d'Estaing, de Carvajal, de La Cerda, Rolin, and Torquemada; the vote of Isidore or Calandrini, or both, likely was also required as Borja very likely did not vote for himself; Borja almost certainly did not receive the votes of Colonna, Capranica, or Bessarion.

Cardinal electors

Absentee cardinals

Notes

1455
15th-century elections
1455
15th-century Catholicism
Pope Callixtus III